Massimiliano Mangraviti (born 24 January 1998) is an Italian professional footballer who plays as a midfielder or defender for Brescia.

Club career
Mangraviti made his professional debut in the Serie B for Brescia on 14 May 2016 in a game against Bari.

References

External links
 

1998 births
Living people
Footballers from Brescia
Association football midfielders
Italian footballers
Brescia Calcio players
S.S. Racing Club Fondi players
A.S. Pro Piacenza 1919 players
A.C. Gozzano players
Serie B players
Serie C players